Costa Concordia was a cruise ship operated by Costa Crociere. She was the first of her class, followed by sister ships Costa Serena, Costa Pacifica, Costa Favolosa and Costa Fascinosa, and Carnival Splendor built for Carnival Cruise Line. When the 114,137-ton Costa Concordia and her sister ships entered service, they were among the largest ships built in Italy until the construction of the  s.

On 13 January 2012 at 21:45, Costa Concordia struck a rock in the Tyrrhenian Sea just off the eastern shore of Isola del Giglio. This tore open a  gash on the port side of her hull, which soon flooded parts of the engine room, cutting power from the engines and ship services. As water flooded in and the ship listed, she drifted back towards the island and grounded near shore, then rolled onto her starboard side, lying in an unsteady position on a rocky underwater ledge.

The evacuation of Costa Concordia took over six hours, and of the 3,229 passengers and 1,023 crew known to have been aboard, 32 died. Francesco Schettino, the ship's captain at that time, was tried and found guilty of manslaughter, causing a maritime accident, and abandoning his ship. The wreck was salvaged three years after the incident and then towed to the port of Genoa, where she was scrapped.

Concept and construction 

Costa Concordia was ordered in 2004 by Carnival Corporation from Fincantieri and built in the Sestri Ponente yard in Genoa, as yard number 6122. At the vessel's launch at Sestri Ponente on 2 September 2005, the champagne bottle, released by model Eva Herzigová, failed to break when swung against the hull the first time. This type of occurrence is considered a bad omen among seafarers, and this incident has been partially blamed for the ship's 2008 accident and 2012 sinking.

The ship was delivered to Costa on 30 June 2006. It cost €450 million (£372 million) to build. The name Concordia was intended to express the wish for "continuing harmony, unity, and peace between European nations".

Description 
These main generators provided power for all shipboard consumers from propulsion motors to hotel functions such as lighting and air conditioning. The ship was propelled by two 21-megawatt electric motors coupled to fixed-pitch propellers.

Layout 
Costa Concordia had 13 public decks, each named after a European state. Deck 1 was the lowest:

Amenities 
Costa Concordia was outfitted with approximately 1,500 cabins; 505 with private balconies, and 55 with direct access to the Samsara Spa, which were considered Spa staterooms; 58 suites had private balconies and 12 had direct access to the spa. Costa Concordia had one of the world's largest exercise facility areas at sea, the Samsara Spa, a two-level,  fitness center, with gym, a thalassotherapy pool, sauna, Turkish bath and a solarium. The ship had four swimming pools, two with retractable roofs, five Jacuzzis, five spas, and a poolside movie theatre on the main pool deck. There were also five on-board restaurants, with Club Concordia and Samsara taking reservations-only dining. There were thirteen bars, including a cigar and cognac bar and a coffee and chocolate bar. Entertainment options included a three-level theatre, casino, a futuristic disco, a children's area equipped with video games and a basketball court. She also had aboard a Grand Prix motor racing simulator and an internet café.

Accidents and incidents

2008 bow damage 

On 22 November 2008, Costa Concordia suffered damage to her bow when high winds over the Sicilian city of Palermo pushed the ship against its dock. There were no injuries and repairs started soon after.
Initial repairs were completed by the December following the incident, but dents were still visible.  The area was later fully repaired in 2011 during the ship's refurbishment.

2012 grounding and partial sinking

On 13 January 2012, under the command of Captain Francesco Schettino, Costa Concordia departed Civitavecchia, the port that serves Rome, Italy, for a seven-night cruise. Taking on water, the vessel listed to the port side.

Despite the gradual sinking of the ship, its complete loss of power, and its proximity to shore in calm seas, an order to abandon ship was not issued until over an hour after the initial impact. Although international maritime law requires all passengers to be evacuated within 30 minutes of an order to abandon ship, the evacuation of Costa Concordia took over six hours. At the time, she was carrying 3,206 passengers and 1,023 crew members. The accident resulted in 32 fatalities. The body of the last missing person, Indian crew member Russel Rebello, was recovered on 3 November 2014. It appears that Rebello died while saving other passengers.

Salvage

An initial assessment by salvage expert company Smit International estimated that the removal of Costa Concordia and her 2,380 tonnes of fuel could take up to 10 months. Smit advised that the ship had been damaged beyond the hope of economical repair and recommended it be written off as a constructive total loss. Smit was soon contracted to initially remove only Concordia's fuel.

During the fuel removal operation, Smit reported that the ship had shifted  in the three weeks since her grounding, but that there was no immediate prospect of her breaking up or sinking deeper. Removal of the fuel from the various fuel tanks distributed throughout the ship was completed in March 2012, later than Smit's initial estimates. This cleared the way to arrange for the ultimate salvaging and scrapping of the ship.

On 17 September 2013, Costa Concordia was brought to a vertical position through a parbuckling procedure. The cost for salvaging the ship increased to $799 million. In addition, the ship had suffered severe hull deformations in two places. Titan Salvage, the company directing the salvage operations, estimated that the next phase of the salvage operation would be completed by early-to-mid-2014. After this "floating" operation, the ship would be towed to a salvage yard on the Italian mainland for scrapping or "breaking".

On 14 July 2014, work commenced to refloat Costa Concordia in preparation for towing. At this point, the costs had risen to €1 billion. Including tow cost, €100 million for the ship to be broken up for scrap and the cost of repairing damage to Giglio island, the estimated final cost was expected to be €1.5 billion ($2 billion). It arrived at port on 27 July, after a four-day journey. It was moored to a seawall at the port, awaiting dismantling processes.

On 11 May 2015, following initial dismantling, but still kept afloat by the salvage sponsons, the hull was towed  to the Superbacino dock in Genoa for removal of the upper decks. The last of the sponsons were removed in August 2016 and the hull was taken in to a drydock on 1 September for final dismantling. Scrapping of the ship was completed on 7 July 2017.

In popular culture
In 2010, Costa Concordia provided the setting for Jean-Luc Godard's film Socialisme.

U.S. poet and singer Patti Smith wrote parts of her 2012 album Banga onboard the ship. Smith and Lenny Kaye were invited by Godard to accompany him while he was shooting Socialisme. The Banga CD booklet includes photos taken of Smith and her band during their cruise.

On 11 April 2012, a documentary broadcast in the United Kingdom, titled Terror at Sea: The Sinking of the Costa Concordia, and another first broadcast on Channel 4, titled The Sinking of the Concordia: Caught on Camera, featured footage recorded by the passengers and crew.

On 14 July 2012, a documentary titled Cruise Ship Disaster: Inside the Concordia, was first broadcast on the Discovery Channel, CNN Presents: Cruise to Disaster, first broadcast by CNN and another, titled Inside Costa Concordia: Voices of Disaster, was first broadcast by the National Geographic Channel. The season 39 Nova episode "Why Ships Sink" discusses the sinking of Costa Concordia. A later Nova season 42 episode "Sunken Ship Rescue" featured the salvage effort and race to refloat and remove the badly damaged Costa Concordia from the accident scene before the ship could break apart, risking an environmental catastrophe.

In Paolo Sorrentino's 2013 film The Great Beauty, the wreckage of Costa Concordia is featured.

On 10 November 2015 the U.S. syndicated true crime TV series Corrupt Crimes aired an episode about the Costa Concordia sinking titled Death on the High Seas.

References

External links 

 Personal account by passenger Peter Wieslaw Grajda
 Nautical chart and satellite photo of grounding site – la Repubblica

 

2005 ships
Cruise ships of Italy
Maritime incidents in 2012
Ships built in Genoa
Ships built by Fincantieri
Ships of Costa Cruises
Ships sunk in collisions
Shipwrecks in the Mediterranean Sea
2012 in Italy
Sunken cruise ships